Isaac Sackey (born 4 April 1994) is a Ghanaian footballer who plays as a midfielder for Süper Lig club Ümraniyespor.

Career
Born in Berekum, Sackey began his career at Liberty Professionals.

On 21 September 2012, he left Liberty Professionals, signing a contract with FC Slovan Liberec.

On 8 August 2016, he has signed with Alanyaspor of the Turkish Süper Lig. 

On 20 July 2022, Sackey signed a one-year deal with an option to extend with Ümraniyespor.

References

External links
FC Slovan Liberec profile

Uefa profile
Eurofotbal profile

1994 births
Living people
People from Berekum
Ghana international footballers
Ghanaian expatriate footballers
Ghanaian footballers
Liberty Professionals F.C. players
FC Slovan Liberec players
Alanyaspor footballers
Denizlispor footballers
Hatayspor footballers
Ümraniyespor footballers
Ghana Premier League players
Czech First League players
Süper Lig players
Association football midfielders
Expatriate footballers in the Czech Republic
Expatriate footballers in Turkey
Ghanaian expatriate sportspeople in the Czech Republic
Ghanaian expatriate sportspeople in Turkey